Iris LaVerne Davis-Hicks (April 30, 1950 – September 18, 2021) was an American track and field sprinter who specialized in the 100-meter dash. She was the 1971 Pan American Games champion in that event and also won a gold medal in the 4 × 100-meter relay. She represented the United States at the 1972 Munich Olympics and twice narrowly missed out on a medal: first in the 100 m, placing fourth behind Cuba's Silvia Chivás, then in the relay, where Chivás again outsprinted her to bronze on the final leg.

Davis was born in an African-American family in Pompano Beach, Florida. Nationally she was a four-time champion: twice in the 100 m (1971, 1973) and twice in the 60-meter dash (1972, 1973). She was runner-up in the 100-yard dash in 1969 and 1970, and also had top three placings in the 100 m at the 1972 Olympic trials and the 1972 outdoor championships.

She was a member of the Tigerbelles collegiate team for Tennessee State University, which had a strong history of women's sprinting including double Olympic champion Wyomia Tyus.

International competitions

National titles
USA Outdoor Track and Field Championships
100 m: 1971, 1973
USA Indoor Track and Field Championships
60 m: 1972, 1973

See also
List of 100 metres national champions (women)

References



1950 births
2021 deaths
People from Pompano Beach, Florida
Track and field athletes from Florida
American female sprinters
African-American female track and field athletes
Pan American Games gold medalists for the United States
Pan American Games medalists in athletics (track and field)
Athletes (track and field) at the 1971 Pan American Games
Tennessee State Lady Tigers track and field athletes
Athletes (track and field) at the 1972 Summer Olympics
Olympic track and field athletes of the United States
USA Outdoor Track and Field Championships winners
USA Indoor Track and Field Championships winners
Medalists at the 1971 Pan American Games
Olympic female sprinters
21st-century African-American people
21st-century African-American women
20th-century African-American sportspeople
20th-century African-American women
Sportspeople from Broward County, Florida